Tamás Preszeller (born 24 August 1958) is a former Hungarian professional footballer who played both as a midfielder and full-back, later became a football coach. He was a member of the Hungarian national football team.

Career 
He started his football career in the Mosoni Vasas team. From there he moved to Fehérvár FC, where he played until 1980. From 1980 to 1984 he played for Szombathelyi Haladás. He moved to Győri ETO FC in 1984, where he made 132 matches until 1990. He retired from active football with MTK Budapest FC.

National team 
Between 1986 and 1988 he played seven times for the Hungarian national team and scored one goal.

As a coach 
From 2015 to 2016 he coached the Győri ETO FC football team.

Honours 

 Nemzeti Bajnokság I (NB I)
 Second: 1984-85
 Third: 1985-86

References 

1985 births
Living people
Hungarian footballers
Hungary international footballers
Association football midfielders
Fehérvár FC players
Szombathelyi Haladás footballers
Győri ETO FC players
MTK Budapest FC players
Nemzeti Bajnokság I players
Hungarian football managers
People from Mosonmagyaróvár
Sportspeople from Győr-Moson-Sopron County